Take a Letter is an Australian television game show which aired 1967 on the 0-10 Network (now Network Ten). It aired Mondays to Fridays in a daytime time-slot and was hosted by Jimmy Hannan. A word game based on Scrabble, it was produced in Melbourne.

Reception
Sydney Morning Herald said of the series "it is a fairly harmless and moderately entertaining piece of nonsense.

References

External links
 

1967 Australian television series debuts
1967 Australian television series endings
Black-and-white Australian television shows
English-language television shows
1960s Australian game shows
Network 10 original programming